Eric Roll, Baron Roll of Ipsden  (born Erich Roll; 1 December 1907 – 30 March 2005) was a British academic economist, public servant and banker. He was made a life peer in 1977.

Biography

Roll was born in Nowosielitza, Austro-Hungarian Empire and grew up near Czernowitz in Bukovina, which became part of Romania and is now part of Ukraine. His parents, Matthias and Fanny Roll, were of Middle European origin.

His father was a bank manager, and his mother's brother was a distinguished member of the law faculty at the University of Vienna. When World War I saw Russian troops burned down the village, his family took refuge in Vienna. His parents then sent him to England in the 1920s and he studied at Birmingham University. Shortly afterwards, he completed his PhD and published his first book. He mixed with artistic and creative circles.

By the age of 28, Roll became Professor of Economics and Commerce at University College, Hull, appointed with the backing of John Maynard Keynes and Lord Stamp. Perhaps his most enduring work from this time was the publication in 1938 of his book A History of Economic Thought, which subsequently went through several editions. During World War II, however, he was recruited to the civil service as deputy head of the British Food Mission (1941–1946), where he was principally involved in the procurement of food supplies - most notably dried eggs. He made a number of contacts in the United States and rejected the offer to head the General Agreement on Tariffs and Trade, instead joining the British Ministry of Food. His economic experience and contacts made him invaluable in the post-war government and he was the British representative in the Paris discussions on Marshall aid. He played an important role in the setting up of European and trans-Atlantic institutions before rejoining the Ministry of Agriculture, Fisheries and Food.

Roll was about to accept the vice-chancellorship of Liverpool University, but was asked to go to Washington, D.C. as economic minister at the British embassy from 1963 to 1964. Then, when Labour won the 1964 election, he became permanent secretary of the new Department of Economic Affairs, despite not agreeing with its development.

Roll was also a director of the Bank of England between 1968 and 1977, chairman of the merchant bankers SG Warburg, and a director of The Times.

Roll became Joint President of the Policy Studies Institute, London, in 1978. He was Chancellor of Southampton University 1974-84.

He was chairman of the Bilderberg meetings between 1986 and 1989.

Honours

He was created a life peer as Baron Roll of Ipsden, of Ipsden in the County of Oxfordshire, on 19 July 1977.

Personal life

Roll married Winifred Taylor in 1934 and they had two daughters, Joanna and Elizabeth. Lady Roll died in 1998.

Major publications

 
An Early Experiment in Industrial Organization: History of the Firm of Boulton and Watt 1775-1805, Routledge, 1968
Crowded Hours (autobiography), 1985.

References

External links 

 

1907 births
2005 deaths
Academics of the University of Hull
Austrian emigrants to the United Kingdom
Roll of Ipsden
Chairmen of the Steering Committee of the Bilderberg Group
British economists
Historians of economic thought
Permanent Under-Secretaries of State for Economic Affairs
Civil servants in the Ministry of Food
Civil servants in the Ministry of Agriculture, Fisheries and Food
Companions of the Order of the Bath
Knights Commander of the Order of St Michael and St George
Members of the Steering Committee of the Bilderberg Group
Alumni of the University of Birmingham
Naturalised citizens of the United Kingdom
People from Chernivtsi
Chancellors of the University of Southampton
Life peers created by Elizabeth II